Gurab (also Romanized as Gūrāb; also known as Gūrāb-e Nāshelīl) is a village in Holayjan Rural District, in the Central District of Izeh County, Khuzestan Province, Iran. At the 2006 census, its population was 283, in 52 families.

References 

Populated places in Izeh County